The following is a list of Nippon Professional Baseball players with the last name starting with V, retired or active.

V

References

External links
Japanese Baseball

 V